The following highways are numbered 390:

Canada
New Brunswick Route 390
Newfoundland and Labrador Route 390
 Quebec Route 390

Japan
 Japan National Route 390

United States
  Interstate 390
  Arkansas Highway 390
  Florida State Road 390
  Illinois Route 390
  Kentucky Route 390
  Louisiana Highway 390
  Maryland Route 390
 New York:
  New York State Route 390
  New York State Route 390A
  County Route 390 (Erie County, New York)
  Pennsylvania Route 390
  Puerto Rico Highway 390
  South Carolina Highway 390
  Tennessee State Route 390
  Farm to Market Road 390
  Virginia State Route 390
  Wyoming Highway 390